Manju  is a Sanskrit word meaning pleasant, sweet, snow, beautiful, clouds, morning dew and is predominantly an Indian female given name.
                                                                                   
 Manju Kak, a Kashmiri writer

Manju may also refer to:

Manchuria or Manju, a region of China 
Manju or Manchu people, a people from Manju
Manju (era), a Japanese era name
Manjū, a Japanese confection
Manju (novel), an Indian novel written by M. T. Vasudevan Nair
Manju (film), a 1982 Indian film based on the novel

See also
Manjunath (disambiguation)
 Manjusri